The northern clawless gecko (Crenadactylus naso) is a species of gecko endemic to Western Australia and Northern Territory in Australia.

References

Crenadactylus
Reptiles described in 1978
Reptiles of the Northern Territory
Reptiles of Western Australia
Taxa named by Glen Milton Storr